Punta Vagno Lighthouse is an active lighthouse located on the same name Cape at the east entrance of the Port of Genoa, Liguria on the Ligurian Sea.

Description
The tower was destroyed during World War II and was rebuilt in 1948. The lighthouse is completely automated and operated by the Marina Militare with the identification code number 1575 E.F.

See also
 List of lighthouses in Italy
 Genoa

References

External links

 Servizio Fari Marina Militare

Lighthouses in Italy